Vellbergia is an extinct genus of lepidosauromorph from the Middle Triassic of Germany. It contains a single species, Vellbergia bartholomaei, which is based on a tiny partial skull from the Ladinian-age Lower Keuper.

References 

Middle Triassic reptiles of Europe
Triassic lepidosauromorphs
Fossil taxa described in 2020
Prehistoric reptile genera